Elaphocera is a genus of scarab beetles belonging to the subfamily Melolonthinae.

Species
Species within this genus include:

 Elaphocera affinis
 Elaphocera alonsoi
 Elaphocera ampla
 Elaphocera angusta
 Elaphocera aristidis
 Elaphocera autumnalis
 Elaphocera baguenae
 Elaphocera barbara
 Elaphocera cacerensis
 Elaphocera capdeboni
 Elaphocera carteiensis
 Elaphocera christina
 Elaphocera churianensis
 Elaphocera cretica
 Elaphocera dalmatina
 Elaphocera denticornis
 Elaphocera elongata
 Elaphocera emarginata
 Elaphocera erberi
 Elaphocera erichsoni
 Elaphocera ferreri
 Elaphocera gibbifrons
 Elaphocera gracilis
 Elaphocera heydeni
 Elaphocera hiemalis
 Elaphocera hirticollis
 Elaphocera hispalensis
 Elaphocera ibicensis
 Elaphocera insularis
 Elaphocera kosensis
 Elaphocera lajonquierei
 Elaphocera martini
 Elaphocera martorellii
 Elaphocera nigroflabellata
 Elaphocera nupcialis
 Elaphocera ochsi
 Elaphocera perezlopezi
 Elaphocera phungae
 Elaphocera roessneri
 Elaphocera schmidti
 Elaphocera segurensis
 Elaphocera staudingeri
 Elaphocera sulcatula
 Elaphocera suturalis
 Elaphocera syriaca
 Elaphocera tethys

References

Scarabaeidae